Piauí  was a  destroyer of the Brazilian Navy, serving from 1909 to 1944. She was named after the Brazilian state of Piauí.

Description and Construction

In 1904 Brazil adopted an ambitious plan to renovate and modernize its Navy. The Naval Renovation Program was negotiated and enacted in December 1904 and envisioned acquisition of large number of vessels, including a dozen destroyers. In 1906 the program was modified reducing the total number of destroyers to ten. These ships became known as  destroyers.

Steam for the turbines was provided by two double-ended Yarrow boilers.

The ship mounted two  guns in single mounts. In addition, four 47 mm (3pdr) cannons in single mounts were deployed at the time of launching.

Upon completion of sea trials, Piauí was officially delivered to the Brazilian government on December 21, 1908, with Captain Pedro de Frontin serving as her commander. She left Yarrow's yard on December 28, and departed for Brazil on December 31. The destroyer reached Falmouth in the morning of January 2, 1909, spent three days there, leaving for Vigo on January 5 and reaching it two days later. Piauí departed Vigo on January 10 for Lisbon where she arrived on the same day. The destroyer left Lisbon on January 23 and reached Las Palmas on January 25. On January 30 she sailed out from Las Palmas for Cabo Verde, arriving in St. Vicente on February 1. After spending four days in port, Piauí left St. Vicente on February 5, and successfully arrived in Recife shortly after 11:00 on February 10, 1909. At about 04:00 on February 14, 1909 the ship departed Recife for Bahia where she arrived after a 21 hour journey.

References

Bibliography 
 Gardiner, Robert and Randal Gray, eds. Conway's All the World's Fighting Ships 1906–1921. Annapolis: Naval Institute Press, 1985. . .
 "CT Piauhy - CT 3." Navios De Guerra Brasileiros. Accessed 27 August 2017.

Pará-class destroyers (1908)
1908 ships
Ships built in Glasgow